Inopinodon is a genus of small predatory sea snails, marine gastropod molluscs in the family Acteonidae, the barrel bubble snails.

Species
Species within the genus Inopinodon include:
 Inopinodon azoricus (Locard, 1897)

References

External links
 Bouchet, P. (1975). Opisthobranches de profondeur de l'Ocean Atlantique. I Cephalaspidea. Cahiers de Biologie Marine. 16(3): 317-365
 Gofas, S.; Le Renard, J.; Bouchet, P. (2001). Mollusca. in: Costello, M.J. et al. (eds), European Register of Marine Species: a check-list of the marine species in Europe and a bibliography of guides to their identification. Patrimoines Naturels. 50: 180-213.

Acteonidae